Hauksson is an Icelandic patronymic, literally meaning "son of Hauk". Notable people with the name include:

Ágúst Hauksson (born 1960), Icelandic footballer
Eiríkur Hauksson (born 1959), Icelandic footballer
Georg Guðni Hauksson (1961–2011), Icelandic painter
Haukur Heiðar Hauksson (born 1991), Icelandic footballer
Óskar Örn Hauksson (born 1984), Icelandic footballer

Icelandic-language surnames